Kotha Kamalapuram is a panchayat in the Singareni mandal of the Khammam district in the Indian state of Telangana.

Geography 
Kotha Kamalapuram is located 27 km North of district headquarters Khammam and  10 km from madal headquarters Singareni. The neighbouring villages of Kotha Kamalapuram are Pulluru of Dornakal mandal, Pocharam of Garla mandal and Gate karepalli and Patha Kamalapuram villages of Singareni mandal.

References 

Villages in Khammam district